The 2015–16 Albany Great Danes men's basketball team represented the University at Albany, SUNY during the 2015–16 NCAA Division I men's basketball season. The Great Danes, led by 15th year head coach Will Brown, played their home games at SEFCU Arena and were members of the America East Conference. They finished the season 24–9, 13–3 in America East play to finish in second place. They lost in the quarterfinals of the America East tournament to Hartford. They were invited to the College Basketball Invitational where they lost in the first round to Ohio.

Roster

Schedule

|-
!colspan=12 style="background:#452663; color:#FFC726;"| Non-conference regular season

|-
!colspan=12 style="background:#452663; color:#FFC726;"| American East regular season

|-
!colspan=12 style="background:#452663; color:#FFC726;"| America East tournament

|-
!colspan=12 style="background:#452663; color:#FFC726;"| CBI

References

Albany Great Danes men's basketball seasons
Albany
Albany Great Danes men's basketball
Albany Great Danes men's basketball
Albany